Blue Girl (1899–1919) was an American Thoroughbred racemare that was the Champion 2 and 3-year old female in 1901 and 1902, respectively.

Pedigree
Blue Girl was bred in Kentucky by the Ezekiel Clay & Catesby Woodford breeding partnership and foaled at Clay's Runnymeade Stud. She was sired by Sir Dixon, the 1888 Belmont Stakes winner, out of the mare Bonnie Blue. Bonnie Blue was sired by the influential American sire Hindoo and also produced the semi-successful stallion Blues. Blue Girl was sold as a 2-year-old in 1901 to John E. Madden, the owner of the Lexington stud farm Hamburg Place.

Racing career
Blue Girl was trained by John Madden as a two-year-old and won the Juvenile Stakes, Eclipse, Great Trial, and Great American Stakes for Madden, netting $38,230 in purse money. She was bought by William Collins Whitney in late 1901 and won the Great Filly Stakes winning $23,975. As a 3-year-old, Blue Girl won the Gazelle and Ladies Handicap. She started in the Flying Handicap, run at Sheepshead Bay, but she became lame during the race. This was her last start, and overall Blue Girl started 12 times and won 7 races.

Offspring
Blue Girl was retired in 1903 and was sent to Whitney's Brookdale Stud farm. She was sold to Frederick Johnson (as representative for Harry Payne Whitney) for $10,000 in October 1904 after William Whitney's death.  Blue Girl was sent to Britain in 1912, but returned to the United States in 1915 due to anti-American Thoroughbred sentiment and the passage of the Jersey Act. She produced thirteen foals, but none were as successful as Blue Girl. Her offspring include:
Tammany Hall, chestnut gelding by Meddler (1904)
Blue Grass, chestnut filly by Hamburg (1906)
Dalenburg, chestnut colt by Hamburg (1907) (exported to Britain)
Bay filly by Hamburg (1908)
Eton Blue, bay filly by Hamburg (1909)
Brush By, colt by Broomstick (1910)
Delft, bay filly by Burgomaster (1911, died 1926), granddam of 1926 2-year-old champion Scapa Flow
Blume (GB), chestnut filly by Broomstick (1913)
Bit of Blue (GB), chestnut filly by Lemberg (1914)
Cobalt, bay gelding by Willonyx (1915)
Blue Laddie, bay gelding by Cylgad (1916)
Sky Blue, chestnut filly by All Gold (1918) 
Chestnut colt by Pennant  (1919, died 1920)

Blue Girl died in 1919 at the Brookdale Stud.

References

1899 racehorse births
1919 racehorse deaths
Racehorses bred in Kentucky
Thoroughbred family 4-m